SM City Iloilo is a large shopping mall in the Philippines, owned and operated by SM Prime Holdings. It is the 8th SM Supermall built by Henry Sy Sr. It is located along Senator Benigno Aquino Jr. Avenue (Jaro West Diversion Road) in the district of Mandurriao in Iloilo City.

Mall features 
SM City Iloilo is a four-level complex namely lower ground floor, upper ground floor, second floor, and third floor with a total retail floor area of 181,657 sq.m. located at Mandurriao, Iloilo City. The mall features a department store, supermarket, 8 cinemas, appliance center, food hall, food court and a cyberzone. The SM Foodcourt on the Lower Ground Level of the Main Building, SM Cyberzone at the Third Level of the Northpoint, SM Food Hall at the 2nd Floor of the Northpoint.

History
The mall complex was designed by Palafox Associates with D.A. Abcede & Associates as consultants and Young Builders Corporation as the contractor. Built on the same design template of SM City Fairview and SM City Bacoor at the height of Asian Financial Crisis, its interior, and the external facade has a resemblance to the two other malls. SM City Iloilo was opened to the public on June 11, 1999. The mall features main anchors like The SM Store, SM Supermarket, SM Cinemas, SM Food Hall and SM Foodcourt. The mall underwent a major renovation in the 2nd quarter of 2008 and was completed in the 1st quarter of 2009. TeleTech Customer Care Management Philippines Inc., a BPO company, used to occupy the entire 3rd level of the mall (not including the expansion wing) until 2021. The former area is currently being renovated for conversion to tenant spaces.

In 2015, the new expansion wing (also known as Northpoint in SM City Iloilo's Facebook posts) was opened on the north side of the mall to accommodate more than 165 local and international shops and restaurants. It also featured the third SM Food Hall in the country after SM Megamall and SM Aura and a larger Cyberzone in the 3rd Level. The expansion is seamlessly connected to the main building.

On November 11, 2016, the SouthPoint Expansion with a floor area of  opened and is located near the south entrance of the main mall. The area was formerly occupied by a parking area. It was built to house additional food-based tenants. The SouthPoint Expansion is connected to the Main Mall through a bridge. It also has a mini park with the fountain court.

The mall's Cinemas 1-4 were closed for renovation in 2022 and reopened on February 28, 2023, initially with three regular cinemas (including the Large Format Cinema under new Cinema 3) with the other cinemas at the former Cinemas 3-4 will be re-opening in late 2023, while Cinemas 5-8 will be converted to tenant spaces.

SM Strata BPO Tower
SM Strata, a BPO tower and parking garage, is located at the northeastern side (at the Northbound section of Diversion Road) facing the main mall. The first 6 parking levels were opened on November 11, 2017, with a connection from the footbridge in the 2nd floor. It will have 18 floors, the ground level will serve as a transportation terminal, the 2nd to 5th floors serves as a parking area for SM Clients, and the 6th to 18th floors will be reserved for the BPO offices. It also hosts the first Telus International Philippines contact center outside Metro Manila, along with Teletech (which relocated from the 3rd Level of the mall) and Legato Technologies. The building has a GFA of 45,000 sqm.

A second tower will be built and to be completed in 2023.

Mall complex developments

Park Inn by Radisson Iloilo
Known as the first Park Inn hotel in the Visayas, the 10-storey hotel is built next to the mall's SouthPoint Expansion and has 199 rooms.

Style Residences
The first SMDC development in Iloilo, it is a five 16-storeys condominium building that is targeted for completion on 2023.

References

 http://business.inquirer.net/210463/sm-prime-to-build-3-bpo-towers-outside-manila

External links
The SM Store. Official website.
SM Prime Holdings. The official website of the parent company.
SM Supermarket. The official website of SM Supermarket

Shopping malls in Iloilo City
Shopping malls established in 1997
SM Prime
Buildings and structures in Iloilo City